Auspex International is a company founded in London in 2018 by former Cambridge Analytica staff. It is one of several companies founded by people formerly affiliated with Cambridge Analytica following its downfall in the aftermath of the Facebook–Cambridge Analytica data scandal involving the misuse of data.  The company was to be in the field of data analytics and work in Africa and the Middle East initially.

References

External links
 

2018 establishments in England
Big data companies
Analytics companies
Cambridge Analytica